Arturo Gentili (5 February 1936 – 25 May 2021) was an Italian professional footballer who played as a striker.

Career
Born in Stezzano, Gentili played for Leffe, Atalanta (with whom he won the 1962–63 Italian Cup), Varese, Triestina and Gallaratese.

References

1936 births
2021 deaths
Italian footballers
Association football forwards
U.C. AlbinoLeffe players
Atalanta B.C. players
S.S.D. Varese Calcio players
U.S. Triestina Calcio 1918 players
S.G. Gallaratese A.S.D. players
Serie A players
Serie B players
Sportspeople from the Province of Bergamo
Footballers from Lombardy